The 1974 Nebraska gubernatorial election was held on November 5, 1974, and featured incumbent Governor James Exon, a Democrat, defeating Republican nominee, state Senator Richard D. Marvel. Independent state Senator Ernie Chambers also captured 5% of the vote as a write-in candidate. This was the first gubernatorial election in Nebraska in which the nominees for Governor and Lieutenant Governor ran as a single ticket, though were chosen in separate primary elections.

Democratic primary

Candidates
James Exon, incumbent Governor
Richard D. Schmitz

Results

Republican primary

Candidates
Richard D. Marvel, member of the Nebraska Legislature

Results

General election

Results

References

Gubernatorial
1974
Nebraska